Trip At Knight is the fourth studio album by American rapper and singer Trippie Redd. It was released on August 20, 2021, through 1400 Entertainment and 10k Projects. The album features guest appearances from SoFaygo, Drake, Lil Uzi Vert, Playboi Carti, Ski Mask the Slump God, Polo G, Lil Durk, Babyface Ray, Sada Baby, and Icewear Vezzo; alongside late rappers Juice WRLD and XXXTentacion. Trippie Redd embarked on a tour in support for the album just days after its release. It is a sequel to Life's a Trip, his debut album.

Background
Months before the release of his third studio album Pegasus, Trippie teased a new project that he was working on, called Life's a Trip at Knight, the sequel to his debut studio album Life's a Trip. He then shared three-song snippets reported to be on the next project on his Instagram page, and shared a few details about the upcoming project, explaining how it will relate to Life's a Trip, by the album's cover art alone.

In November 2020, Trippie shared on his Instagram story that this album would contain no features other than his artist and long-time friend, Chris King, who had previously made an appearance on Redd's earlier projects. He wished for this album to be "raw and uncut" and to prove that he can give it his all.

In February 2021, in an interview, Redd had provided an update on what the upcoming project would be like. He shared, "my new Trip At Knight, I'm dropping all rage shit. Most of it [is] rage shit. I love rage music. We gon' rage and do some 'Dark Knight Dummo' shit.", when further mentioning some of the featured artists on the album to include the Kid Laroi, Polo G, and Lil Tjay. The album's tracklist was announced on August 11, 2021, featuring 18 tracks.

On August 20, 2021, Trip at Knight was released with 17 tracks. "Betrayal", featuring Drake, was excluded from the initial release, but was included on Trip at Knight (Complete Edition) which was released on August 21, 2021, one day later.

Singles
Trippie Redd released the lead single for the album, "Miss the Rage", a collaboration with American rapper Playboi Carti, on May 7, 2021. This was followed by the second single "Holy Smokes", featuring American rapper Lil Uzi Vert on July 16, 2021. "Captain Crunch" featuring Sada Baby, Babyface Ray, and Icewear Vezzo, "MP5" featuring SoFaygo", and "Matt Hardy 999" featuring Juice WRLD were all sorted as singles with the Trip at Knight cover on streaming services, with two receiving music videos

Critical reception

Kyann-Sian Williams of NME gave Trip at Knight 3 out of 5, saying that while Trip at Knight has "embrace[d] the colourful production of hyper-pop", the album experiences "a lack of quality control". Williams believes that Trippie should "slow down and focus on longevity". When comparing Trip at Knight and Life's a Trip, Williams believes that Trip at Knight doesn't "tend to reward repeat listens" while Life's a Trip does.

Commercial performance
Trip at Knight debuted at #2 on the Billboard 200 with 81,000 album-equivalent units, of which 5,000 were pure sales. The album also earned 107.99 million streams first week. The following week, the album earned 37,000 sales, solidifying second-week position at #9.

Track listing

Notes
 Although "Betrayal" featuring Drake was originally listed by Trippie Redd as part of the tracklisting, the song was not part of the album upon its initial release. However, Betrayal was later released in the complete edition of Trip at Knight on August 21, 2021.  
 In addition, "Molly Hearts" and "Super Cell" were originally listed on Trippie Redd's announcement as "Molly Heart" and "Supercell", respectively.

Charts

Weekly charts

Year-end charts

Certifications

References

2021 albums
Trippie Redd albums
Hyperpop albums
Rap rock albums by American artists
Albums produced by Cashmere Cat
Albums produced by Hitmaka
Albums produced by Taz Taylor (record producer)
Pop-rap albums